The 1807 Land Lottery was the second lottery of the Georgia Land Lotteries, a lottery system used by the U.S. state of Georgia between the years 1805 and 1833 to steal and redistribute Cherokee and Muscogee land.  The 1807 lottery was authorized by the Georgia General Assembly by an act of June 26, 1806. The lottery redistributed land in Baldwin and Wilkinson counties. 202.5 acre lots were redistributed in both counties. The 1807 lottery were used to steal Muscogee land and redistribute it to white settlers. Registrations for the lottery took place between June 26 and September 26, 1806, with drawings occurring between August 10 and September 23, 1807. Fortunate drawers from the previous 1805 lottery were excluded.

See also
Georgia Land Lotteries
1805 Land Lottery
1820 Land Lottery
1821 Land Lottery
1827 Land Lottery
1832 Land Lottery
Gold Lottery of 1832
1833 Fractions Lottery
Georgia resolutions 1827
Indian removal

References

External links
Georgia Land Lottery Records Research Guide, Random Acts of Genealogical Kindness

1807 in Georgia (U.S. state)
Georgia Land Lotteries
Government of Georgia (U.S. state)
History of Georgia (U.S. state)
Muscogee
Lotteries in the United States